The De Contas River (Portuguese: Rio de Contas) is a river of Bahia state in eastern Brazil. In Portuguese, it is sometimes erroneously called "Rio das Contas". It is the main river of the hydrographic basin named after him.

Its source is in Tromba Mountain, between the municipalities of Piatã and Rio de Contas, passing through the cities of Abíra, Jussiape, Dom Basílio, Tanhaçu, Jequié (where the Pedras Dam was erected), Jitaúna, Ipiaú, Itagibá, Barra do Rocha, Ubatã, Ubaitaba and Aurelino Leal, to finally to its mouth in the Atlantic Ocean in Itacaré.

Hydrographic basin 

It is one of the sixteen hydrographic basins of the Brazilian state of Bahia, and is subordinate administratively to the National Department of Works to Combat Drought (DNOCS). The basin comprises its main effluents, which are: Brumado River, António River, Gongogi River, Jequiezinho River, Gavião River, Sincorá River and Jacaré River.

Its economic uses are varied: irrigation, energy production, mining, and supplying the cities in its perimeter.

It is the largest basin that is entirely located in the Brazilian state of Bahia, in which are located 86 municipalities, a territory equivalent to 10.2 percent of the state territory.

Its limits: in west by the São Francisco Basin; in east by the Atlantic Ocean; in South by do Rio Pardo and Rio Colônia basins and the Brazilian state of Minas Gerais; and in North by the basins of the Paraguaçu River and Jequiriçá River.

See also
List of rivers of Bahia
Rio de Contas - Bahia city, by the banks of Brumado River, former De Contas Pequeno River

References
 

Brazilian Ministry of Transport

Rivers of Bahia